Gordiacea is a genus of achilid planthoppers in the family Achilidae. There are at least two described species in Gordiacea.

Species
These two species belong to the genus Gordiacea:
 Gordiacea oculata (Melichar, 1903) c g
 Gordiacea patula (Chen, Yang & Wilson, 1989) c g
Data sources: i = ITIS, c = Catalogue of Life, g = GBIF, b = Bugguide.net

References

Further reading

 
 
 
 
 

Achilidae
Auchenorrhyncha genera